The border between Brazil and Colombia is  long. The boundary was delimited in two treaties:
the Vásquez Cobo-Martins treaty of 1907, establishing the line from the Rio Negro northwestward along the Amazon River-Orinoco watershed divide, "then generally southward along various river courses and straight-line segments to the mouth of the Apaporis River", and
the Tratado de Límites y Navegación Fluvial of 1928, delimiting the Apaporis-Amazon segment of the boundary as a "geodesic line identical to its Brazilian-Peruvian antecedent after Colombia gained undisputed sovereignty over the area".

Border towns
: Tabatinga, Benjamin Constant, Lauarete, Vila Bittencourt, Ipiranga, Cucui.
: Leticia, Tarapacá, La Pedrera, Mitú, Taraira, Yavaraté, La Guadalupe.

External links
Map of the border between Brasil and Colombia
Geodesic points of the border between Brasil and Colombia
Health and Displacement at the border between Brasil and Colombia

References

 
Borders of Brazil
Borders of Colombia
International borders